The 2022 NAPA Auto Parts ARCA West 150 was the 7th stock car race of the 2022 ARCA Menards Series West season, and the 59th iteration of the event. The race was held on Saturday, August 20, 2022, in Monroe, Washington at Evergreen Speedway, a 0.656 mile (1.039 km) permanent oval-shaped short track. The race took the scheduled 150 laps to complete. After a late race caution, Tanner Reif, driving for Sunrise Ford Racing, took the lead away from Cole Moore, and held off teammate Jake Drew for his second career ARCA Menards Series West win, and his second of the season. To fill out the podium, Joey Iest, driving for Naake-Klauer Motorsports, would finish 3rd, respectively. 

This race was mostly known as the 1,000th ARCA West race to be held in series history.

Background 
Evergreen Speedway is an automobile racetrack located within the confines of the Evergreen State Fairgrounds in Monroe, Washington. The stadium can accommodate up to 7500 spectators in the covered grandstand and an additional 7500 in the uncovered modular grandstands. The layout of the track is unique in that it incorporates an oversized 5/8-mile paved outer oval, a 3/8-mile paved inner oval, a 1/5-mile paved inner oval, a 1/8-mile dragstrip, and the #2 ranked figure-eight track in the United States. The track is the only sanctioned NASCAR track in Washington State. Evergreen Speedway hosts Formula D the third weekend in July every year. Along with NASCAR, the multi-purpose track can be configured to road courses with sanctioned SCCA, USAC, ASA and NSRA events. Under new ownership for the 2011 season and beyond, Evergreen Speedway has become a NASCAR Top Ten Short Track in North America from 2012 though 2016.

Entry list 

 (R) denotes rookie driver

Practice/Qualifying 

Practice and qualifying were both combined into one 90-minute session, with a driver's fastest time counting as their qualifying lap. It was held on Saturday, August 20, at 2:30 PM PST.

Race results

References

External links 

2022 ARCA Menards Series West
NAPA Auto Parts
2022 in sports in Washington (state)